Haikou Century Bridge is a cable-stayed bridge in Haikou city, the capital of Hainan province.

The bridge was built to link the main part of Haikou city to Haidian Island, a district separated from Hainan Island by the Haidian River. Haikou Century Bridge crosses at the mouth of the river approximately 50 metres west of Haikou New Port.

History

The project was started in 1998 and was opened to traffic on August 1, 2003.

Haikou Century Bridge is the largest bridge on Hainan Island spanning 2,683 meters in length and 29.8 meters in width. It is available for automotive traffic only.

The cost of the Century Bridge project was approximately 660 million Renminbi (US$80 million).  Part of the cost of the bridge was paid by Japanese banking loans, while other parts were paid by Haikou's city budget. The bridge was built by China Wanbao Engineering Corp.

References

Bridges completed in 2003
Road bridges in China
Bridges in Hainan
Transport in Hainan
2003 establishments in China